T. Sean Shannon is from Houston, Texas.  His brother Charles Shannon (d.2003) was also a stand-up comedian, and writer.

As a writer for Saturday Night Live he won an Emmy Award in 2002 (nominated in 2001 & 2003) and a WGA Award in 2001 (nominated in 2001, 2002 and 2003). He is the writer and creator of the sketch Bear City, which deals with a city completely inhabited by anthropomorphic bears due to a meteor crash.  In July 2008, Shannon revealed that he had written a Bear City movie.

He was also the subject of controversy and political unrest at SNL, thanks to a joke he told in The Aristocrats, Penn Jillette mentions this incident in the commentary for the film, but does not mention the show, instead stating that T. Sean works for a popular network comedy show.

He directed and co-wrote the feature film Harold that was released in July 2008.

References

External links

American comedy writers
American film directors
American male screenwriters
American stand-up comedians
American television directors
American television writers
Writers Guild of America Award winners
Living people
American male television writers
Year of birth missing (living people)